Antonio Garzoni Provenzani (2 December 1906 in Rome – 15 February 1989) was an Italian rower who competed in the 1932 Summer Olympics.

In 1932 he won the bronze medal as member of the Italian boat in the coxless four competition.

References

External links
 
 
 
 
 

1906 births
1989 deaths
Rowers from Rome
Italian male rowers
Olympic rowers of Italy
Rowers at the 1932 Summer Olympics
Olympic bronze medalists for Italy
Olympic medalists in rowing
Medalists at the 1932 Summer Olympics
European Rowing Championships medalists